Carlos Calderson is a retired Spanish association football player who played professionally in USL A-League and the Major Indoor Soccer League.

Player
Calderson spent his youth playing in the Racing Club Portuense Academy.  In 1990, he joined Portuense’s first team, playing there for two seasons.  Portuense then loaned him to UD Roteña.  In 1995, Calderson moved to the United States to attend Christian Heritage College.  While there, he played for the school’s soccer team, gaining 1996 Honorable Mention, 1997 Second Team and 1998 First Team NCCAA All American recognition.  In 1998, Calderson spent the collegiate off-season with the Cascade Surge.  In 1999, Calderson signed with the San Diego Flash of the USL A-League.  In 2002, the Flash ceased operations and Calderson joined the Charlotte Eagles.  After two seasons, he moved to the Cascade Surge of the USL Premier Development League.  In addition to his outdoor career, Calderson also played indoor soccer.  In 2003, he spent time with the San Diego Sockers of the Major Indoor Soccer League.  He then played for the Monterrey Fury during the 2003-2004 MISL season.  Calderson played for the third version of the San Diego Sockers of the Professional Arena Soccer League from 2008 to 2010 season.

Coach
In 2007, Calderson coached the Ohio Christian University to a 1-16-0  He then became the head coach at San Diego Christian College.

External links
 San Diego Christian: Carlos Calderson

References

Living people
1973 births
Cascade Surge players
Charlotte Eagles players
Major Indoor Soccer League (2001–2008) players
Professional Arena Soccer League players
San Diego Flash players
San Diego Sockers (2001–2004) players
San Diego Sockers (PASL) players
Spanish footballers
Spanish expatriate footballers
A-League (1995–2004) players
USL League Two players
Association football midfielders